Giannis Konstantelias (born 5 March 2003) is a Greek professional footballer who plays as a midfielder for Super League club PAOK.

Career

Early career
Konstantelias was nine years old when he went to the academy of Agia Paraskevi in Volos. Initially, he trained with his peers, but he quickly got into the training of the older ones.
In 2013 PAOK entered his life and from Volos he was in Thessaloniki. At first he played as a forward, then he moved to the center, but also to the sides.
At PAOK Academy he worked, worked hard, experienced good moments, gained valuable experiences in domestic and international tournaments and was twice named MVP.

PAOK
In 2021, Konstantelias broke in to the PAOK's first team, as on January 17 he made his first appearance with the men's team in the OFI vs PAOK game. Shortly before he turned 18 years old. In fact, he finished the season, playing in a total of three games.

On 20 January 2022, Konstantelias signed a six months' contract with Jupiler Pro League club Eupen on loan from PAOK. On the same day, PAOK announced the extension of the contract with the young international until the summer of 2026.

Honours

Club
PAOK 
Greek Cup: 2020–21

References

2003 births
Footballers from Volos
Living people
Greek footballers
Greece youth international footballers
Association football midfielders
PAOK FC players
K.A.S. Eupen players
Super League Greece players
Belgian Pro League players
Greek expatriate footballers
Expatriate footballers in Belgium
Greek expatriate sportspeople in Belgium